Mihailo Lalić (7 October 1914 – 30 December 1992) was a Montenegrin and Serbian writer.

Biography
He was born in Trepča (Andrijevica municipality) village in north-eastern Montenegro in 1914. His most important novels are "Svadba", "Zlo proljeće", "Raskid", "Hajka", "Ratna sreća", and his masterpiece, "Lelejska gora".

He won the NIN Award (NIN magazine's prize for the novel of the year) for "Ratna sreća" in 1973, and was the first recipient of "Njegoš Award" for "Lelejska gora". In his novels he depicted  major events in modern history of Montenegro, World Wars in particular, and battling between communist Partisans and collaborationist Chetniks.

He lived in Herceg-Novi and Belgrade, and was a member of both the Montenegrin and Serbian Academy of Sciences and Arts, whose vice-president he was. He was also a member of  SKOJ and Communist Party. He died in Belgrade in 1992.

Bibliography

Short stories
 Izvidnica (The Patrol) (1948)
 Prvi snijeg (The First Snow) (1951)
 Na mjesečini (In the Moonlight) (1956)
 Posljednje brdo (The Last Hill) (1967)

Novels
 Svadba (The Wedding) (1950)
 Zlo proljeće (The Evil Spring) (1953)
 Raskid (Separation) (1955)
 Lelejska gora (The Mountain of Cries) (1957, 1962)
 Hajka (The Pursuit) (1960)
 Pramen tame (The Lock of Darkness) (1970)
 Ratna sreća (The Luck of War) (1973)
 Zatočnici (The Advocates) (1976)
 Dokle gora zazeleni (Until the Mountain Turns Green) (1982)
 Gledajući dolje na drumove (Looking Down on the Roads) (1983)
 Odlučan čovjek (Determined Man) (1990)

References

External links

Montenegrin Literary Works Online

1914 births
1992 deaths
People from Andrijevica
People of the Kingdom of Montenegro
Vasojevići
Central Committee of the League of Communists of Yugoslavia members
Montenegrin novelists
Members of the Montenegrin Academy of Sciences and Arts
Yugoslav Partisans members
Yugoslav novelists
Recipients of the Order of the Hero of Socialist Labour